Benjamin Frank Diamond (born October 9, 1978) is an American attorney and politician serving as a member of the Florida House of Representatives from the 68th district, which includes most of the city of St. Petersburg, Florida, Pinellas County.

Early life and education
Born in Clearwater, Florida, Diamond graduated from Yale University in 2000, and earned his Juris Doctor from the University of Florida Levin College of Law in 2003, where he was editor-in-chief of the Florida Law Review. Diamond's maternal grandfather was the late Representative Dante Fascell, who represented Dade and Monroe Counties in the United States House of Representatives for 19 consecutive terms, from 1955 to 1993.

Career 
Prior to his election to the state house, Diamond was a member of the board of directors of the Pinellas Suncoast Transit Authority (2014–2016), general counsel (2009–2011) and special counsel (2007–2009) to the Florida Chief Financial Officer, and law clerk to Judge Emmett Ripley Cox of the United States Court of Appeals for the Eleventh Circuit (2004–2005).

Florida House of Representatives 
In the 2016 to 2018 term, Representative Diamond serves on the following House committees:
 Agriculture & Natural Resources Appropriations Subcommittee 
 Agriculture & Property Rights Subcommittee 
 Civil Justice & Claims Subcommittee 
 Judiciary Committee 
 Natural Resources & Public Lands Subcommittee

In the 2018 to 2020 term, Representative Diamond serves on the following House committees:
 Member, Appropriations Committee
 Ranking Minority Member, Judiciary Committee
 Member, Subcommittee on Civil Justice
 Member, Subcommittee on Insurance and Banking

2022 U.S. House campaign 
On May 10, 2021, Diamond announced his candidacy for Florida's 13th congressional district in the 2022 election. On May 17, 2022, he suspended his campaign due to being drawn out of the district.

References

External links
 Ben Diamond at the Florida House of Representatives 
 Campaign website

1978 births
21st-century American Jews
21st-century American politicians
Florida lawyers
Fredric G. Levin College of Law alumni
Jewish American state legislators in Florida
Living people
Democratic Party members of the Florida House of Representatives
People from Clearwater, Florida
Politicians from St. Petersburg, Florida
Yale University alumni